Thunderbolt and Lightfoot is a 1974 American crime comedy film written and directed by Michael Cimino and starring Clint Eastwood, Jeff Bridges, George Kennedy, and Geoffrey Lewis.

Plot 
A young ne'er-do-well, Lightfoot steals a car. Elsewhere, an assassin attempts to shoot a preacher who is delivering a sermon at his pulpit. The preacher escapes on foot. Lightfoot, who happens to be driving by, inadvertently rescues the preacher by running over his pursuer and giving the preacher a lift. They steal a series of cars, patronize prostitutes, and escape another attempt on their lives by two men.

Lightfoot learns that the "minister" is a notorious bank robber (known as "The Thunderbolt" for his use of an Oerlikon 20 mm cannon to break into a safe) who has been hiding out in the guise of a clergyman following the robbery of a Montana bank. Thunderbolt tells Lightfoot that the ones trying to kill him are members of his gang who mistakenly think Thunderbolt double-crossed them.  Thunderbolt is the only member of the gang who knows where the loot is hidden. He and Lightfoot journey to Warsaw, Montana, to retrieve the money hidden in an old one-room school. They discover the schoolhouse has been replaced by a brand-new school.

Thunderbolt and Lightfoot are abducted by the men who were pursuing them: the vicious Red Leary and the gentle Eddie Goody. After being forced to drive to a remote location, Thunderbolt wins a fistfight with Red, after which Thunderbolt explains that he never betrayed the gang. Lightfoot proposes another heist: robbing the same company as before, but without the gang's electronics expert, Dunlop, the man Lightfoot hit with his car. In the city where the bank is located, the men find jobs to raise money for needed equipment while they plan the heist.

When the robbery begins, Thunderbolt and Red hold a guard at gunpoint and force him to reveal the access codes to outer doors of the safe. Lightfoot, dressed as a woman, distracts the Western Union office's security guard, deactivates the ensuing alarm, and is picked up by Goody. Like the first heist, Thunderbolt uses an anti-aircraft cannon to breach the vault's wall, and the gang escapes with the loot. They flee in the car, with Red and Goody in the trunk, to a nearby drive-in movie in progress. After hearing a sneeze from the trunk and seeing a shirt tail protruding from the trunk lid, the theater manager suspects someone is hiding in the trunk to avoid paying and so goes to investigate. As wailing police cars begin to close in on the drive-in theater and as the theater manager gets nearer, Red becomes increasingly agitated and Thunderbolt drives out of the drive-in, encountering police at the exit. During the ensuing chase, Goody is shot as the police open fire on the vehicle. Red, callous as ever, throws him out of the trunk onto a dirt road, where he dies.

Red then forces Thunderbolt and Lightfoot to stop the car. He pistol-whips them both, knocking them unconscious, and kicks Lightfoot in the head. Red takes off with the loot in the getaway car but is again pursued by police, who shoot Red several times, causing him to lose control of the car and crash through the window of a department store, where he is attacked and killed by the store's vicious watchdog.

Recovered from the beating, Thunderbolt and Lightfoot make their way towards the highway, though Lightfoot has begun to display signs of brain damage.  They hitch a ride the next morning and are dropped off near Warsaw, Montana, where they stumble upon the one-room schoolhouse, which is now a historical monument on the side of a highway, having been moved there from its original location after the first heist. As the two men retrieve the stolen money, Lightfoot's behavior becomes erratic as a result of the beating.

Thunderbolt buys a new Cadillac convertible with cash, something Lightfoot said he had always wanted to do, and picks up his waiting partner, who is gradually losing control of the left side of his body. As they drive away celebrating their success with cigars, Lightfoot, in obvious distress, tells Thunderbolt in a slurred voice how proud he is of their accomplishments, then slumps over and dies. Thunderbolt snaps his cigar in half (as it is no longer a celebration) and, with his dead partner beside him, drives off down the interstate and into the distance.

Cast

Production

Development and screenplay 
Michael Cimino wrote the script on speculation, with Eastwood in mind. His agent, Stan Kamen of the William Morris Agency, came up with the idea of packaging the film with Cimino, Bridges, and Eastwood. Eastwood was available after turning down the lead role in Charley Varrick. Due to the great financial success of Dennis Hopper's Easy Rider, road pictures were a popular genre in Hollywood. Eastwood himself wanted to do a road movie. Agent Leonard Hirshan brought the script to Eastwood from fellow agent Kamen. Reading it, Eastwood liked it so much that he originally intended to direct it himself. However, on meeting Cimino, he decided to give him the directing job instead, giving Cimino his big break and feature-film directorial debut. Cimino later said that if it was not for Eastwood, he never would have had a career in film. Cimino patterned Thunderbolt after one of his favorite '50s films, Captain Lightfoot. The music was composed by Dee Barton but the end titles song "Where Do I Go From Here?" was composed and performed by Paul Williams.

Shooting 
Although Eastwood generally refused to spend much time in scouting for locations, particularly unfamiliar ones, Cimino and Eastwood's producer Robert Daley traveled extensively around the Big Sky Country in Montana for thousands of miles and eventually decided on the Great Falls area and to shoot the film in the towns of Ulm, Hobson, Fort Benton, Augusta and Choteau and surrounding mountainous countryside. The film was shot in 47 days from July to September 1973. It was filmed in Fort Benton, Wolf Creek, Great Falls, and Hobson. St. John's Lutheran Church in Hobson was used for the opening scene. The imaginary freeway exit signage (Warsaw Exit 250) for the fictional town of Warsaw, was in reality, the Interstate 15 exit for Dearborn, an unincorporated community that straddles the Cascade/Lewis & Clark County Line. The scene where Thunderbolt recovers the money from the one-room schoolhouse was filmed at the rest stop just south of Exit 240, which is the exit for Dearborn.

Eastwood did not like to do any more than three takes on any given shot, according to co-star Bridges. "I would always go to Mike and say 'I think I can do one more. I got an idea.' And Mike would say 'I gotta ask Clint.' Clint would say, 'Give the kid a shot.'" Charles Okun, first assistant director on Thunderbolt, added, "Clint was the only guy that ever said 'no'. Michael said 'OK, let's go for another take.' It was take four, Clint would say 'No we got enough. We got it.' [...] And if [Cimino] took too long to get it ready, [Clint] would say, 'It's good, let's go.'"

Release 
Thunderbolt was released on May 22, 1974. The film grossed $9 million in rentals on its initial theatrical release and eventually grossed $25 million in the United States, making it the 17th highest-grossing film of 1974. The film did respectable box office business, and the studio profited, but Clint Eastwood vowed never to work with the movie's distributor United Artists again due to what he felt was bad promotion. According to author Marc Eliot, Eastwood perceived himself as being upstaged by Bridges.

Thunderbolt and Lightfoot was released to DVD by MGM Home Video on June 13, 2000, as a Region 1 widescreen DVD and also by Twilight Time on February 11, 2014, as a Region A Blu-ray.

Reception 
Howard Thompson of The New York Times praised the film as "a funny, tough-fibered crime comedy with an unobtrusive edge of drama. With Clint Eastwood as an older, wise thief and Jeff Bridges as his grinning apprentice, the picture is consistently entertaining and interesting." Arthur D. Murphy of Variety called it "an overlong, sometimes hilariously vulgar comedy-drama, about the restaging of a difficult safecracking heist. Debuting director Michael Cimino, who also wrote the rambling, anticlimactic script, obtained superior performances from Eastwood, George Kennedy, Geoffrey Lewis and especially Jeff Bridges, outstanding as a young drifter who joins the gang." Gene Siskel of the Chicago Tribune gave the film two-and-a-half stars out of four and wrote that "one is left wondering what attracted these actors to a story that leaves every flash of humanity for a protracted robbery, shootout, or some manner of cruelty. Eastwood and Bridges try to build an older-younger brother relationship during the film; it is lost, however, amid all the killings and explosions." Kevin Thomas of the Los Angeles Times called it "a rambunctious and surprisingly touching movie", adding that "writer Michael Cimino, in a potent directorial debut, displays a clear, concise style and very impressive control." Gary Arnold of The Washington Post wrote that the film "takes about an hour to get down to business, and it's such a weirdly kinked-up, trumped-up exercise in formula moviemaking, with indiscriminate borrowings from this film and that film and almost schizoid variations in tone and style, that one begins to wonder if Eastwood's truest fans will find it slightly indigestible too." John Raisbeck of The Monthly Film Bulletin stated, "John Milius' collaborator on the screenplay for Magnum Force, Michael Cimino makes his directorial debut with Thunderbolt and Lightfoot, a film as interestingly idiosyncratic if not as controlled as Milius' Dillinger. The script, also by Cimino, is packed with excellent moments, but somehow the whole never amounts to more than the sum of its parts." Jay Cocks of Time magazine called the film "one of the most ebullient and eccentric diversions around." Leonard Maltin gave the film three out of four stars, describing it as "Colorful, tough melodrama-comedy with good characterizations; Lewis is particularly fine, but Bridges steals the picture."

On Rotten Tomatoes, the film has an approval rating of 88% based on reviews from 32 critics. The website's consensus is "This likable buddy/road picture deftly mixes action and comedy, and features excellent work from stars Clint Eastwood and Jeff Bridges and first-time director Michael Cimino." Thunderbolt has since become a cult film.

As a result of this film and Cimino's TV commercial work, producer Michael Deeley would approach Cimino to direct and co-write the Oscar-winning The Deer Hunter (1978).

Jeff Bridges received the film's only nomination for an Academy Award for Best Supporting Actor. Eastwood's acting performance was noted by critics to the extent that he himself believed it was Oscar-worthy.

Analysis 
Author Michael Bliss wrote that while Thunderbolt may appear to be a conventional violent action film with Eastwood in the lead role, the film is more like "a meditation on, than a representation of, the male camaraderie theme" using rhetorical devices such as symbols, camerawork, and allusive dialogue to add to that theme. According to Bliss, the film's structural paradigm describes a tripartite series of events: natural order followed by disturbance followed by a restoration of natural order.

See also 
 List of American films of 1974

References

Footnotes

Bibliography 
 Bach, Steven (September 1, 1999). Final Cut: Art, Money, and Ego in the Making of Heaven's Gate, the Film That Sank United Artists (Updated ed.). New York: Newmarket Press. .
 Bliss, Michael (1985). "Two For The Road". Martin Scorsese and Michael Cimino (Hardcover ed.). Metuchen, New Jersey: Scarecrow Press. pp. 151–165. .
 Carducci, Mark Patrick (writer); Gallagher, John Andrew (editor) (1989). "Michael Cimino". Film Directors on Directing (Paperback ed.). Westport, Connecticut: Praeger Publishers. .
 Deeley, Michael (April 7, 2009). Blade Runners, Deer Hunters, & Blowing the Bloody Doors Off: My Life in Cult Movies. New York: Pegasus Books LLC. .
 Eliot, Marc (October 6, 2009). American Rebel: The Life of Clint Eastwood (1st ed.). New York: Rebel Road, Inc. .
 Hughes, Howard (2009). Aim for the Heart. London: I.B. Tauris. .
 McGilligan, Patrick (1999). Clint: The Life and Legend. London: Harper Collins. .

Further reading 
 Wood, Robin (2003). "From Buddies to Lovers". Hollywood from Vietnam to Reagan (Revised and Expanded ed.). New York: Columbia University Press. .

External links 

 
 

1974 films
1970s action comedy-drama films
1970s buddy comedy-drama films
1970s crime comedy-drama films
1970s road comedy-drama films
American action comedy-drama films
American buddy comedy-drama films
American chase films
American crime comedy-drama films
American heist films
American road comedy-drama films
1970s English-language films
Films directed by Michael Cimino
Films set in Montana
Films shot in Montana
Malpaso Productions films
United Artists films
1974 directorial debut films
1970s American films